This article refers to Nephi, the author of Third Nephi, and one of the twelve disciples of Jesus.  See also Nephi (disambiguation).
According to the Book of Mormon, Nephi the Disciple   was a Nephite prophet during the 1st century, and a chosen disciple of Jesus Christ. Nephi's ministry was centered on Christ, and included prophesying of His birth, working miracles in His name, witnessing His visitation to the Americas after the Resurrection, and administering His church after He had ascended. Nephi was also the appointed recordkeeper for the Nephites during this period, and much of the text of Third Nephi is abridged from his account.

Known genealogy

Early life 

Nephi is first mentioned in the Book of Mormon when he inherits the Nephite records and sacred artifacts from his father, Nephi, son of Helaman, in the year 1 B.C. He lived (and was likely raised) in the Nephite capital city, Zarahemla, where his father lived and subsequently departed from, leaving Nephi with the full responsibilities of scribe. Neither Nephi's childhood nor age are referenced in the abridgement, although he had at least one younger sibling, Timothy. It is believed  that he was born in 30 BC.

Pre-Christ Ministry 

In the ninety-second year of the Reign of the Judges (1 BC), a "great uproar" broke out amongst the population over the yet-unfulfilled (and according to the "unbelievers", past-due) prophecy of Samuel the Lamanite, that Christ's birth would be signified by a new star and a night without darkness. Those who continued to look forward to the sign of Christ were scheduled for a mass execution.

Nephi, deeply disturbed by the wickedness of the people, "prayed mightily" to God for the condemned believers, even all day. Finally, the voice of the Lord came to him, saying:
"Lift up your head and be of good cheer; for behold, the time is at hand, and on this night shall the sign be given, and on the morrow come I into the world, to show unto the world that I will fulfil all that which I have caused to be spoken by the mouth of my holy prophets."

As promised, when the sun set that evening, the sky remained as bright as midday, fulfilling the anticipated prophecies and effectively preventing the impending genocide. A majority of the population was converted by this event, and Nephi went about "baptizing unto repentance, in the which there was a great remission of sins", which temporarily restored peace to the land.

Despite the mass change of heart, and the continued preaching of Nephi and "many others" however, by 96 ROJ (AD 3), the people had already returned to wickedness and discrediting the miracles they had seen. For the next twenty-seven years, they would continue to fluctuate between extremes of piousness and rebellion, until finally abandoning their faith altogether. The government of over 120 years was intentionally corrupted and assassinated into extinction, and the society unraveled into tribes.

Nephi, having witnessed this downfall, renewed his efforts and began to preach with such boldness and power that the people "were angry with him, even because he had greater power than they, for it were not possible that they could disbelieve his words".

Additionally, Nephi performed miracles in the name of Christ, including casting out devils, healing the sick, and raising his brother from the dead. He continued to preach and baptize throughout AD 33, converting "many".

In the advent of the next year, the signs of Christ's death, three hours of unparalleled destruction followed by three days of darkness (also prophesied by Samuel the Lamanite) were given.

See also

References

Further reading
 Nephi in the index of the Latter-day Saint Book of Mormon.

Book of Mormon prophets